Heather Ann Thompson is an American historian, author, activist, professor, and speaker from Detroit, Michigan. Thompson won the 2017 Pulitzer Prize for History, the 2016 Bancroft Prize, and other awards for her work Blood in the Water: The Attica Prison Uprising of 1971 and Its Legacy.

Early life 
Thompson was born in Lawrence, Kansas. Her parents, Ann Curry Thompson, a labor lawyer in Detroit, and Frank Wilson Thompson Jr., a professor of economics at the University of Michigan and Summer School lecturer at Harvard University. Heather Ann's sister is Saskia Thompson, the current executive director of the Detroit Land Bank. Thompson's early childhood was spent in Bloomington, Indiana, and Oxford, England, but in her teen years the family moved to the North Rosedale Park neighborhood of Detroit, Michigan. Thompson graduated from Cass Technical High School.

Career
Thompson earned bachelor's and master's degrees from the University of Michigan and completed her PhD at Princeton University. Thompson was a faculty member at the University of North Carolina, Charlotte, from 1997 to 2009, and then was a faculty member of Temple University in Philadelphia from 2009 to 2015. In 2015. Thompson returned to the Detroit area when she and her husband (historian Jonathan Daniel Wells), accepted faculty positions at the University of Michigan. Thompson writes about the history and current crises of mass incarceration for numerous publications. Her work has been featured in The New York Times, Newsweek, The Washington Post, Jacobin, NBC, Time, The Atlantic, Salon, Huffington Post, and Dissent. She has also appeared on NPR, Sirius Radio, and various television news programs in the U.S. and abroad. Several of Thompson's scholarly pieces, including "Why Mass Incarceration Matters", have won best article awards, and her popular piece in The Atlantic, "How Prisons Change the Balance of Power in America", was named a finalist for the Best Media Award given by the National Council on Crime and Delinquency. Thompson was a Soros justice fellow, she founded the Carceral State Project and Documenting Criminalization and Confinement research initiative at the University or Michigan, she sits on the board of numerous organizations, and is a member of the standing Committee in Law and Justice at the National Academies. She served on a National Academy of Sciences blue-ribbon panel to study causes and consequences of incarceration in the U.S. Thompson's books include: Blood in the Water: The Attica Prison Rebellion of 1971 and its Legacy (Pantheon Books, August 2016); Whose Detroit: Politics, Labor and Race in a Modern American City (2001, new edition 2017); and the edited collection, Speaking Out: Protest and Activism in the 1960s and 1970s. Thompson was also named a distinguished lecturer by the Organization of American Historians.

The Attica uprising of 1971 
The culmination of more than a decade of research, Blood in the Water offers the first definitive account of the 1971 Attica Prison riot. The book was released in August 2016 to coincide with the forty-fifth anniversary of the country's largest prison rebellion. The book sheds new light on the riot, the state's violent response, and the decades-long implications of Attica for those involved as well as America's criminal justice system. Thompson's research for the book included interviews with former Attica prisoners, hostages, families of victims, lawyers, judges, law enforcement, and state officials, as well as significant amount of material never before released to the public.

History of Detroit and the present-day motor city
Thompson's 2001 book, Whose Detroit? Politics, Labor and Race in a Modern American City is a regularly cited account of the history of Detroit during the tumultuous 1960s and 1970s. It is a comprehensive account of police brutality against marginalized groups, and the black political reaction to it in this period, as well as the underlying reasons for why Detroit became such a crucial site of black political activism and black political power after 1973. The book was published by Cornell University Press and a new edition was published in 2017 to mark the 50th anniversary of the Detroit riot of 1967. This updated edition addresses issues currently facing Detroit as well as the city's recent bankruptcy and the current challenges the city faces thanks to record rates of incarceration.

Publications

Books
 Thompson, Blood in the Water: The Attica Uprising of 1971 and its Legacy (Pantheon Books, 2016). .
 Thompson, ed. Speaking Out: Protest and Activism in the 1960s and 1970s (Prentice Hall, 2009). 
 Thompson, Whose Detroit: Politics, Labor and Race in a Modern American City (Cornell University Press, 2001/2017).

Articles
 Thompson, "How Attica's Ugly Past is Still Protected", Time, May 26, 2015.
 Thompson, "How Prisons Change the Balance of Power in America", The Atlantic, October 7, 2013.
 Thompson, "Rethinking Working Class Struggle through the Lens of the Carceral State: Toward a Labor History of Inmates and Guards", Labor: Studies in the Working Class History of the Americas (Fall, 2011).
 Thompson, "The Lingering Injustice of Attica", Op-ed, The New York Times, September 9, 2011.
 Thompson, "Why Mass Incarceration Matters: Rethinking Crises, Decline and Transformation in Postwar American History", Journal of American History (December 2010).

Awards and recognition
Winner Pulitzer Prize in History, 2017.
Winner Bancroft Prize in American History and Diplomacy, 2017
Winner Ridenhour Book Prize, 2017.
Winner J. Willard Hurst Book Prize in Socio-Legal History, 2017.
Law and Literature Prize, 2017
Cundill Prize in History, Longlist, 2017.
Honorable Mention. Silver Gavel Award. American Bar Association. March 2017.
Finalist Los Angeles Times Book Prize 2017. Blood in the Water: The Attica Prison Uprising of 1971 and its Legacy February 2017. (announcement of award, April 2017)
Winner. Book Prize. New York City Bar Association. January 2017
Blood in the Water: The Attica Prison Uprising of 1971 and its Legacy named on 14 "Best Books of 2016" lists, including those compiled by The New York Times, Newsweek, Kirkus Review, The Boston Globe, Publishers Weekly, Bloomberg, the Marshall Project, the Baltimore City Paper, Book Scroll, and the Christian Science Monitor. Additionally, Blood in the Water was named on the Best Human Rights Books of 2016 list, and received starred reviews from Library Journal, Kirkus, and Publishers Weekly. 
Finalist for the National Book Award for Nonfiction 2016. Blood in the Water: The Attica Prison Uprising of 1971 and its Legacy. October 2016
Finalist, 2015 J. Anthony Lukas Award for Best Work-in-Progress in Non-Fiction, Columbia School of Journalism, March 2015.
 Finalist, 2014 Media for a Just Society Awards for Magazine Article: "How Prisons Change the Balance of Power in America" The Atlantic, National Council for Crime and Delinquency.
 Appointed Distinguished OAH Lecturer, Organization of American Historians, 2013.
 Most Distinguished Scholarly Article Award for "Rethinking Working Class Struggle Through the Lens of the Carceral State: Toward a Labor History of Inmates and Guards", Labor: Studies in Working Class History of the Americas (Fall, 2011). Awarded by the Labor Movements Section. The American Sociological Association.
 Best Article in Urban History Award for "Why Mass Incarceration Matters: Rethinking Crisis, Decline, and Transformation in Postwar American History", Journal of American History (December 2010). Awarded by Urban History Association, 2011.
 Soros Justice Fellowship, The Open Society Institute, 2006-2007.
 Rockefeller Archive Center Research Grant, The Rockefeller Foundation, 2004.
 Research Fellowship, National Endowment for the Humanities, 2000-2001.

References

External links
 
 

American community activists
American crime writers
American criminologists
Pulitzer Prize for History winners
1969 births
Living people
American women historians
Women crime writers
Writers from Detroit
University of Michigan faculty
Cass Technical High School alumni
Princeton University alumni
University of Michigan alumni
20th-century American historians
21st-century American historians
20th-century American non-fiction writers
21st-century American non-fiction writers
20th-century American women writers
21st-century American women writers
American women criminologists
Bancroft Prize winners
Historians from Michigan